Coaraze is a commune in the Alpes-Maritimes department in the Provence-Alpes-Côte d'Azur region in southeastern France.

Geography
Coaraze is a small village in the Nice hinterland, in the valley of the River Paillon.

History
Erected as a baronnie in 1629, Coaraze was under Spanish administration from 1744 to 1748. In the nineteenth century the old trail was replaced by a road.

Population

Its inhabitants are called Coaraziens.

Tourism
Coaraze is one of sixteen villages grouped together by the Métropole Nice Côte d'Azur tourist department as the Route des Villages Perchés (Route of Perched Villages). The others are: Aspremont, Carros, Castagniers, Colomars, Duranus, Èze, Falicon, La Gaude, Lantosque, Levens, La Roquette-sur-Var, Saint-Blaise, Saint-Jeannet, Tourrette-Levens and Utelle.

Coaraze is a member of the Les Plus Beaux Villages de France (most beautiful villages of France) association.

Personalities
 Jean Cocteau
 Jules Engel
 Paul Vérola: poète, écrivain, cousin du Tsar par alliance

See also
Communes of the Alpes-Maritimes department

References

Communes of Alpes-Maritimes
Plus Beaux Villages de France
Alpes-Maritimes communes articles needing translation from French Wikipedia